Adam Kury (born July 7, 1969) is an American bassist and vocalist. He is best known as the bassist for the American alternative rock band Candlebox. Based in Los Angeles, California, he has been the bassist for Candlebox since the band reunited in 2008. 

Kury has also performed with notable acts such as Legs Diamond, Jagger Cook and several others. He also performed music for the movie, Gone Fishin'. He currently works in numerous projects/bands including The Kings Royal, Dave Giles, 7th Sun, and Whipped Cream.

References

Sources
Adam Kury
Yahoo! Movies - Adam Kury
Legs Diamond

1969 births
Living people
American rock bass guitarists
American male bass guitarists
Candlebox members
Guitarists from California
American male guitarists
20th-century American guitarists